Nayatol is a village located in Begusarai District, Bihar, India. It is one among the 38 villages of Mansurchak.

Geography
The geographical coordinates i.e. latitude and longitude of Nayatol is 25.608349 and 85.947060 respectively.

Demographics
Nayatol's population is 2740 of which 1432 are male and 1308 are female. This village has 458 children in the age bracket of 0–6 years. Among them 251 are boys and 207 are girls.

Literacy ratio in Nayatol village is 58%. In males the literacy rate is 63% compared with 52% for women.

Kastoli

Education

Transport
Dalsinghsarai are the nearby by towns to Nayatol having road connectivity to Nayatol. Bachwara Jn Rail Way Station, Sathajagat Rail Way Station are the very nearby railway stations to Nayatol. Dalsingh Sarai Rail Way Station (near to Dalsinghsarai), Sathajagat Rail Way Station (near to Dalsinghsarai) are the Rail way stations reachable from near by towns. How ever	Barauni Jn Rail Way Station is major railway station 21 KM near to Nayatol.

Climate

References

Cities and towns in Begusarai district